In November 2016, a wave of fires (both wildfires and urban fires) spread across Israel from south of the Beersheva region to the north, in Nahariya. Some of the fires occurred naturally; others were arson attacks. On 28 November, after 8 days, the firefighting services announced that the emergency condition was over. Firefighters fought 1,773 fires, at least 39 were reported as major fires that required at least ten crews or more. The largest fire occurred in Haifa, where 527 apartments were destroyed among 77 buildings, leaving 1,600 people homeless. 75,000 residents, about a quarter of the city's population, were evacuated from 11 neighborhoods. Other major fires occurred in Zikhron Ya'akov and in the Jerusalem area, as well as smaller fires all across Israel and the West Bank.

While most of the fires were caused by weather conditions and negligence, some of the fires were caused by arsonists suspected of being nationally motivated Arabs. Two Arab citizens of Israel confessed they deliberately set up fires. At least 35 people were arrested on suspicion of setting fires or inciting to do so. More than 15 were citizens of the Palestinian Authority and at least 10 were Arab citizens of Israel. Officials in Israel have stated that the deliberate setting of fires is a form of terrorism. As of 28 November, at least 25 cases of fires were caused by suspected arsons.

On January 13, 2017, The Israeli fire investigation (The "Gal Report") had found that out of 80 checked fires, 71 resulted from arson. On April 4, 2017, the head of the Israeli fire investigation unit had declared: "The fires had been acts of terrorism committed by members of the Arab population against the Jewish population. 90% of the fires had been caused by arson. The arsonists were Arabs and the victims were Jews."

Background 
The fires came after two months of drought in the area. Regions of Jerusalem and the West Bank are also affected. Officials identify "extreme weather", including high temperatures and dry winds, for helping fires spread.

Fires

Haifa 

Fires in Haifa occurred in dozens of areas and they have consumed buildings in five different locations. 75,000 residents of 11 neighborhoods were evacuated by firefighters and the search and rescue Kedem Battalion of the Home Front Command. Two schools were evacuated: Fichman School and Reali (Beit Biram), while there was a fire burning inside Beit Biram itself. On 17:08 (ISTׁ) it was reported that 163 people were hurt including three children and a 6 month old, mainly smoke inhalation. One woman was moderately injured. 350 firefighters and 115 firefighting vehicles are operating in the city.
3 residents were detained by police forces under suspicion of arson after being spotted near one of the epicentres. The fire calmed down in the night between the 24th and 25th and residents were allowed to return in 25 November's afternoon while the fire was still raging out of the city.

The damage cost from the fire in Haifa was estimated at 500,000,000 Shekels.

Zikhron Ya'akov 
The fires in Zikhron Ya'akov started on 22 November as a result of arson in the Givat Eden neighborhood in the northern part of the town. 8 people, including two children and a 10-day-old infant were treated for smoke inhalation. 30 homes were burnt and at least 10 homes were destroyed. Several roads were closed, including Highway 4 and Highway 70. Residents of Givat Eden and the surrounding areas were evacuated and told to shut their gas lines. They were allowed to return except for those whose houses were damaged when fire was brought under control after 29 hours of fighting. Public Security minister Gilad Erdan said that evidence has been found that the initial fire in Zikhron Ya'akov was a result of arson involving gasoline.

Jerusalem mountains 
Fires erupted at around 02:00 (IST), 25 November next to Beit Meir. All of the residents, includings 300 people at the guest house, mostly from nearby Shoresh were evacuated and some houses were damaged. 25 firefighting crews were working at the scene and shortly before 05:30 the flames were extinguished. The police began conducting search operations to find suspects. Residents reported that they saw several suspects fleeing the area after the fire began to spread and the police arrested one suspect.

Another two great fires erupted on  near Nataf and Maale Hahamisha. The residents of Nataf were evacuated as fire in Nataf burned several houses and a famous restaurant. The fire burnt  in a nearby natural reserve. Remains of molotov cocktails were found and a Palestinian man from the West Bank was arrested on suspicion of setting off the fires.

Halamish 
Fires erupted on the eve of 25 November a great fire consumed large parts of Halamish and the surrounding forest. About 40 houses were set ablaze, of which 15 were burnt to the ground. The fire was the result of arson by Palestinians and was denounced by Israeli ministers as "terrorism of fire".

Other fires 
Ein Tamar – fire erupted in a thorn field near the moshav. Four firefighting crews were sent.
Dvir – fire erupted at the Dvira forest near the kibbutz.
Lakhish – fire erupted in the Lakhish forest near the moshav.
Kiryat Gat – fires erupted at two points near the Kiryat Gat intersection in the morning of November 25. The main road in the city was closed and the train movement was canceled.
Dolev – The first fire in the Israeli settlement of Dolev in the West Bank started on 22 November and damaged three caravans in the northernmost neighborhood. 20 homes were temporarily evacuated as 68 firefighters, assisted by volunteers worked to extinguish the fire over night. Firefighter investigation has revealed that the fire was caused by arson.
Talmon – the first fire in Talmon started on 23 November and several neighborhoods were evacuated.
Gilon – fires started on 22 November and caused 80 residents to be evacuated. Three houses were damaged and electricity was temporarily cut. The fire was brought under control after several hours.
Kabul and Tamra – fire erupted between the two Arab towns in northern Israel at the night of 24 November.
Har Halutz – fire erupted near the communal settlement on 24 November and was extinguished in early morning hours of 25 November. The entire community was evacuated during the fire and six houses were damaged.
Iksal and Nazareth Illit – fire erupted between the Arab town and the mixed city on 24 November.
Ka'abiyye – fire erupted near the Arab town. Five houses were evacuated in a precautionary step.
Ya'ad – fire erupted near the moshav on 25 November. Residents of 15 houses were evacuated until the fires were extinguished in the afternoon.
Geulim – fire erupted near the moshav on 25 November. No damage was made.
Binyamina – fire erupted next to the town. One man in his forties was hurt from smoke inhalation.
Harashim – fire erupted in the communal settlement on 25 November and was extinguished on 26 November. Residents of the southern part of the locality were evacuated during the fire.
Daliyat al-Karmel – fire erupted in the Druze town on 25 November and was extinguished by six firefighter crews.

Arsons 
Some of the fires were suspected to have been caused by arsonists. The Israel Police commissioner Roni Alsheikh and the Israel Security Agency announced that the arsons are "likely nationalistically motivated" and that suspects were arrested.

Gilad Erdan, Israel's public security minister, told Army Radio that the professional assessment was that almost half the fires were the result of arson. Prime Minister Benjamin Netanyahu attributed the fires to "natural and unnatural" causes and said that "any fire caused by arson or incitement to arson is terrorism in every sense of the word, and we will treat it as such."

Investigation 
Following the fire, the Israeli fire investigation unit had been investigating the events.

On 30 November 2016 early investigation had led to the statement that most of the fires reported had been arson attacks. According to the head of the fire investigation unit "at first the amount of Arson suspect and natural fires had been the same, but as the time went by and reports had arrived we have learned that many of the fires we have witnessed had been arson." In a later report In April 2017 the head of the investigation unit 90% of the fires had been arson and the fires had been act of terrorism.

Firefighting 

Cyprus, Greece, Russia, Croatia, Italy, Turkey, Jordan, Egypt, Azerbaijan, France, and Ukraine have sent aircraft and other equipment to help fight the fires. The Home Front Command called in soldiers and rescuers to aid with the effort. Netanyahu asked for "Super Tanker" aircraft from the U.S. The Palestinian Authority sent eight firefighting crews, four to the Haifa area and four to the Jerusalem area.
Spain has sent 4 planes (CL-215T or CL-415) to help fight the fires.

Croatia sent two CL-415 with four crews (to ensure non-stop turnaround) on 23. November, right after receiving Israel's request.

Cyprus sent 69 men: 28 firemen, 24 rescuers of the Civil Defence and 17 forest firefighters.

Greece sent on 23 November 2016, immediately upon Israel's request, 3 firefighter planes CL-415, a C-130 plane with 18 personnel, additional 14 technicians, and operation support supplies.

Insurance and restoration 
Private insurance company does not pay insurance money when the cause for the damage is considered to be an act of aggression (מעשה איבה)(war/terrorism etc.), as such people who had lost property and funds had not been able to receive funds to rebuild and fix their properties.

On 30 November 2016, the Israeli Insurance companies and Israeli finance office had come to an agreement where the government will fund 90% of the insured victims. 
 
The Israeli tax authority had published a list of settlements that will receive funds for rebuilding the lost property where they are considering the fires being an act of aggression.

References

External links 

Official website of the Israel Fire and Rescue Services

wildfires
Israel
2016
History of Haifa
November 2016 events in Asia
Wildfires caused by arson
2016 disasters in Israel